The team jumping at the 1988 Summer Olympics took place on 28 September at the Seoul Olympic Stadium.

Results

References

Equestrian at the 1988 Summer Olympics